The 38th Assembly District of Wisconsin is one of 99 districts in the Wisconsin State Assembly.  Located in south-central Wisconsin, the district comprises most of the northern half of Jefferson County, and parts of eastern Dane County and northwest Waukesha County.  It includes the cities of Oconomowoc and Lake Mills, as well as the villages of Cambridge, Deerfield, Johnson Creek, Marshall, and Waterloo.  It also contains Aztalan State Park and the Goose Lake Wildlife Area.  The district is represented by Republican Barbara Dittrich, since January 2019.

The 38th Assembly district is located within Wisconsin's 13th Senate district, along with the 37th and 39th Assembly districts.

List of past representatives

References 

Wisconsin State Assembly districts
Dane County, Wisconsin
Jefferson County, Wisconsin
Waukesha County, Wisconsin